"I'll Never Love Again" is a song from the 2018 film A Star Is Born, performed by its stars Lady Gaga and director Bradley Cooper whose character sings the final chorus in the flashback scene. The soundtrack contained both versions of the song including the extended version that featured Gaga as the sole performer. Gaga wrote the song with Natalie Hemby, Hillary Lindsey, and Aaron Raitiere. Production was done by Gaga and Benjamin Rice. 

The song was positively received and topped the Slovakian digital charts, while entering the top-ten of the record charts in Hungary, Ireland and Scotland, and the digital charts across Europe. "I'll Never Love Again" received a contemporary hit radio release in France as the album's third single on May 27, 2019. It became the album's second overall song to win the Grammy Award for Best Song Written for Visual Media, following the victory of lead single "Shallow", marking the only time to date that a single visual media presentation soundtrack has won this category multiple times at the Grammy Awards.

Background and composition

When Gaga was getting ready to film the final scene of A Star Is Born, where she sings "I'll Never Love Again", the singer got a telephone call that her childhood friend Sonja Durham was in her last moments of Stage IV cancer. Gaga left the set and drove to meet Durham, but she arrived ten minutes after her friend died. She asked Durham's husband if she should return to filming; he replied, "You've gotta do what Sonja would want you to do", so she returned to the set. Co-star and director Bradley Cooper was supportive of Gaga's loss but Gaga was adamant about finishing the scene, so she stepped on the set and sang "I'll Never Love Again". The singer said, "[Sonja] gave me a tragic gift that day and I took it with me to [the] set, and I sang that song for Jackson and for her on that very same day within an hour."

Along with the film version, the soundtrack also contains an extended version. Gaga wrote the song with Natalie Hemby, Hillary Lindsey, and Aaron Raitiere. Both tracks were produced by Lady Gaga and Benjamin Rice. The song is a power ballad, inspired by the music of the 1970s. Brian Truitt of USA Today described the song as a "weepy" ballad. Gaga's singing style ranges from soft "cooing" in her lower register to belting. The song is performed in the key of G major with a moderate tempo of 54 beats per minute in common time. It follows a chord progression of Gadd2–Em7–Cmaj9–D9sus in the verses and Gadd2–Em7(no3)–Cmaj9/E–D9sus in the chorus. Gaga's vocals span from G3 to E5.

Use in film
Gaga's in-movie character, Ally, sings "I'll Never Love Again" in the final scene of the movie. The "climactic" performance cuts away to a flashback, where Jackson is singing the song to Ally for the first time. Vulture, an online blog associated with New York Magazine wrote, "It's an act of pure emotional manipulation on Bradley Cooper's part as a director, but it perfectly encapsulates the characters' relationship: Jackson sees Ally's artistic potential, but it's she who brings it to life."

Critical reception and accolades
"I'll Never Love Again" was acclaimed by music critics, being called "stunning" and "show-stopping". Various outlets predicted it would earn Gaga an Academy Awards nomination for Best Original Song. Vanity Fair Yohana Desta believed that even though "Shallow" was the front-runner in the Oscar race, "I'll Never Love Again" would be "a more traditional choice, and serves as a perfect showcase of Gaga's impressive vocal range", calling it "the most heartrending song on the film's soundtrack". USA Today Patrick Ryan felt that with "I'll Never Love Again", "the film's devastating emotional closer", Gaga is "powering through a formidable number about love and loss with searing vulnerability and grace. It's a transcendent achievement that could single-handedly net the singer-turned-actress her first Oscar, reminding us yet again that she's one of the best vocalists right now in any genre, pop or otherwise."

Billboard Tatiana Cirisano ranked Gaga's performance of "I'll Never Love Again" as the film's best scene and wrote, "Not only are the lyrics devastatingly beautiful, but Gaga/Ally showcases her full, skyscraper-high range." Jon Pareles of The New York Times compared the song to Harry Nilsson's "Without You" and Eric Carmen's "All by Myself", and complimented Gaga's "old-school finesse, timing, emotionality and lung power". Bianca Gracie of Uproxx found it "one of the most powerful film moments" and one of Gaga's all-time best songs, saying she is "at her best when she's stripped away from all the wacky (but still beloved) synths and solely accompanied by a piano." In his film review, Ty Burr of The Boston Globe said Gaga's "climactic memorial" performance of the song "will leave you a soggy mess whether you like it or not". The Washington Post Emily Yahr found it "searing", while Bethonie Butler from the same outlet named it the best song of the soundtrack, where Gaga presents "passionate but controlled vocal runs". She added: "After showcasing her enviable range, Gaga transitions into a honey-tinged, almost jazzlike section that feels as though she ad-libbed it in the studio." Comparing it to "Shallow", NME Nick Reilly said "things get similarly deep" with "I'll Never Love Again", "even if it comes dangerously close to dropping the accomplished emotional edge that came before." The Daily Telegraph Neil McCormick picked "I'll Never Love Again" and "Always Remember Us This Way" Gaga's best solo tracks from the album, saying: "They may be clichéd, sentimental and old-fashioned, but they are powered by enough conviction and vocal drama to suggest that Lady Gaga has the star power to go supernova in any musical era." 

The track evoked performances by Whitney Houston for several outlets. Ben Beaumont-Thomas of The Guardian found it a "hyper-emotional piano ballad, where Gaga channels Whitney for the verses but does something much more affectingly girlish and vulnerable with the high-pitched chorus." Chris DeVille of Stereogum called the track a "fairly blatant attempt to recapture the glory of Whitney Houston's 'I Will Always Love You' cover from The Bodyguard". The Plain Dealer Joey Morona felt the "soundtrack wraps up on a high note" with "I'll Never Love Again", "the kind of show-stopping movie finale song in the vein of 'I Will Always Love You' and 'My Heart Will Go On, Celine Dion's 1997 single from Titanic. Natalie Walker of Vulture desribed the song as "Mariah [Carey]'s 'Without You' meets Whitney's 'I Will Always Love You, and while she found the lyrics "too on the nose", she ultimately appreciated the "climactic finale anthem". Adam White of The Independent wrote that Gaga is "imitating" Whitney's "whoops and hums with uncanny aplomb" in "I'll Never Love Again", which is "secretly the most cinematic number from A Star Is Born as a result – a classic, made-in-Tinseltown ballad powered by stardust and glitter". Writing for Entertainment Tonight, Alex Ungerman opined "Always Remember Us This Way" would have been a more effective end to A Star Is Born, and wrote that "I'll Never Love Again" is "decent, but it feels a little more like a Whitney Houston b-side, than the emotional peak of the movie."

Some journalists appreciated the film version of the track even more, which switches to Bradley Cooper's rendition towards its end.  Stereogum Chris DeVille felt the track "turns out to be more powerful when it cuts from Gaga's bombastic orchestral take to Cooper meekly plucking it out at a piano." Brittany Spanos of Rolling Stone wrote, "I'll Never Love Again" is "meant to be the biggest moment after a series of big moments and it feels as earned as the first time Ally sang an original song in front of an audience. But when the film-version of the song switches to the sound of Jackson singing it to Ally in their home for the first time, that’s when it becomes as classic as the star it births." Pitchfork Larry Fitzmaurice opined it is a "heart-wrenching closer" and even though it is "plenty effective on its own, the dialogue-included version of the song dramatically cuts out in its final seconds the same way the film does: jumping back in time from Gaga's time-stopping performance to a pivotal and heartbreaking scene that only enhances the song's emotional quotient".

At the 62nd Annual Grammy Awards in 2020, "I'll Never Love Again" won the Grammy Award for Best Song Written for Visual Media, one year after the victory of lead single "Shallow" in the same category. This made A Star Is Born the first movie which gained two wins in this category. "I'll Never Love Again" was also handed out an award in the "Song That Left Us Shook" category at the 2019 iHeartRadio Music Awards.

Single release and chart performance

The song was chosen as the third single from the soundtrack on May 27, 2019 in France, where it was serviced to contemporary hit radio stations.

After the soundtrack's release, the song debuted at number 36 on the Billboard Hot 100 chart in the United States and has since sold 226,000 copies in the country, while accumulating 66 million streams. Additionally, it has reached the top ten position in Hungary, Ireland and Scotland, and the top ten of digital charts in Greece, Spain and Luxembourg, reaching the chart summit in Slovakia.

Credits and personnel
Credits adapted from the liner notes of the A Star Is Born soundtrack album.

Management
 Published by Sony/ATV Songs LLC / SG Songs LLC (BMI) / Happygowrucke / Creative Pulse Music/These Are Pulse Songs (BMI).
 All rights administered by These Are Pulse Songs, BIRB Music (ASCAP) / BMG Rights Management (US) LLC
 Warner Tamerlane Publishing Corp. / Super LCS Publishing / One Tooth Productions (BMI), Warner-Barham Music LLC (BMI)
 Extra administration by Songs of Universal (BMI) / Warner-Olive Music LLC (ASCAP) admin. by Universal Music Corp. (ASCAP)
 Recorded at Shrine Auditorium, EastWest Studios, The Village West (Los Angeles, California)
 Mixed at Electric Lady Studios (New York City)
 Mastered at Sterling Sound Studios (New York City)

Personnel

 Lady Gaga – songwriter, producer, primary vocals
 Natalie Hemby – songwriter
 Hillary Lindsey – songwriter
 Aaron Raitiere – songwriter
 Benjamin Rice – producer, recording
 Bo Bodnar – recording assistant
 Alex Williams – recording assistant
 Tom Elmhirst – mixing
 Brandon Bost – mixing engineer
 Randy Merrill – audio mastering
 Chris Johnson – drums
 Jon Drummond – bass
 Brokkett Parsons – keyboards
 Tim Stewart – guitar
 Ricky Tillo – guitar

Orchestra

 Stephen D. Oremus – string engineer
 Peter Rotter – strings contractor
 Alyssa Park – violin
 Julie Gigante – violin
 Charlie Bisharat – violin
 Jessica Guiderl – violin
 Bruce Dukov – violin
 Luanne Homzy – violin
 Benjamin Jacobson – violin
 Phillip Levy – violin
 Lisa Liu – violin
 Maya Magub – violin
 Lucia Micarelli – violin
 Josefina Vergara – violin
 Julie Gigante – violin
 Robert Brophy – violas
 Andrew Duckless – violas
 Matthew Funes – violas
 Darrin McCann – violas
 David Walther – violas
 Steve Eroody – cello
 Jacob Braun – cello
 Eric Byers – cello
 Dennis Karmazyn – cello
 Michael Valerio – contrabass
 Geoffrey Osika – contrabass

Charts

Weekly charts

Year-end charts

Certifications and sales

Cover versions
 In October 2018, Lea Salonga performed the song live during her 40th Anniversary Concert.
 In April 2019, Molly Hocking released a cover of the song after winning the eighth series of The Voice UK. This acted as her winner's single.

See also
 List of top 10 download singles in 2018 (France)

Notes

References

2010s ballads
2018 singles
2018 songs
Bradley Cooper songs
Grammy Award for Best Song Written for Visual Media
Interscope Records singles
Lady Gaga songs
Male–female vocal duets
Pop ballads
Song recordings produced by Ben Rice (producer)
Song recordings produced by Lady Gaga
Songs written by Hillary Lindsey
Songs written by Lady Gaga
Songs written by Natalie Hemby
Songs written for films